The 2nd Law Enforcement Battalion is a military police battalion based at Marine Corps Base Camp Lejeune, North Carolina. It was activated on 2 July 2012, after Marine Corps Bulletin 5400 reactivated the 1st, 2nd and 3rd Military Police Battalions (now designated as Law Enforcement Battalions) in September 2011.

On 17 December 2020, the battalion was deactivated as part of the Marine Corps’ Force Design 2030 plan.

Mission
Conduct law and order operations in order to enhance the security environment and promote the rule of law in support of Marine Air Ground Task Force (MAGTF) operations.

Conduct law and order functions to include law enforcement, policing, police advising/training, and limited detention/correction, patrol/incident response operations, route regulation/enforcement, investigations, Joint Prosecution and Exploitation Center operations, Tactical Site Exploitation, identity operations/biometrics support, protective services operations, military working dog operations, police intelligence, physical security and crime prevention expertise/assessments, accident investigations, customs/border clearance support operations, and Military Police support to civil authorities.

See also
 1st Law Enforcement Battalion
 3rd Law Enforcement Battalion
 4th Law Enforcement Battalion

References

Battalions of the United States Marine Corps
Military police units and formations of the United States